Marko Bijač (born 12 January 1991) is a Croatian water polo player. He was part of the Croatian team at the 2016 Summer Olympics, where the team won the silver medal.

Honours

Club

Jug Dubrovnik

LEN Champions League: 2015–16 ; runners-up: 2012–13, 2016–17
Adriatic League: 2015–16, 2016–17, 2017–18
LEN Super Cup: 2016
Croatian Championship: 2012–13, 2015–16, 2016–17, 2017–18
Croatian Cup: 2015–16, 2016–17, 2017–18
Pro Recco

LEN Champions League: 2020–21
Serie A: 2018–19 
Coppa Italia: 2018–19 , 2020–21
Olympiacos
Greek Championship: 2021–22
Greek Cup: 2021–22, 2022–23

Awards
LEN  "European Player of the Year": 2017
Member of the World Team 2022 by total-waterpolo
 Croatian Water Polo Player of the Year: 2016, 2022
Best Croatian Goalkeeper of the Year: 2015–16, 2017–18,  2020–21, 2021–22
Best Goalkeeper of Adriatic League 2013–14 with Jug Dubrovnik
Best Goalkeeper of the 2015–16 LEN Champions League Final Eight  with Jug Dubrovnik
Best Goalkeeper of the 2020–21 LEN Champions League Final Eight with Pro Recco
Best Goalkeeper of the 2016 Olympic Games in Rio de Janeiro
Olympic Games 2016 Team of the Tournament
Best Goalkeeper of the 2019 World League
Best Goalkeeper of the 2022 European Championship

See also
 Croatia men's Olympic water polo team records and statistics
 List of Olympic medalists in water polo (men)
 List of men's Olympic water polo tournament goalkeepers
 List of world champions in men's water polo
 List of World Aquatics Championships medalists in water polo

References

External links
 

1991 births
Living people
Sportspeople from Dubrovnik
Croatian male water polo players
Water polo goalkeepers
Olympiacos Water Polo Club players
Water polo players at the 2016 Summer Olympics
Medalists at the 2016 Summer Olympics
Olympic silver medalists for Croatia in water polo
World Aquatics Championships medalists in water polo
Competitors at the 2013 Mediterranean Games
Mediterranean Games medalists in water polo
Mediterranean Games gold medalists for Croatia
Expatriate water polo players
Croatian expatriate sportspeople in Italy
Water polo players at the 2020 Summer Olympics
Croatian expatriate sportspeople in Greece